Blink of an Eye is the second studio album by American country music band Ricochet. It was released in 1997 via Columbia Records. The album includes three singles, all of which charted on Billboard Hot Country Songs: "He Left a Lot to Be Desired", the title track, and "Connected at the Heart", at #18, #39 and #44 respectively. "Can't Be Good for Your Heart" was co-written by Porter Howell of Little Texas, and "The Last Love in This Town" was co-written by Don Ellis, formerly of the duo Darryl & Don Ellis.

Track listing

Personnel 
As listed in liner notes.
 Bruce Bouton - steel guitar
 Mike Brignardello - bass guitar
 Joe Chemay - bass guitar
 Larry Franklin - fiddle, mandolin
 Paul Franklin - steel guitar
 John Hobbs - keyboards
 Paul Leim - drums
 Brent Rowan - electric guitar
 Biff Watson - acoustic guitar
 Lonnie Wilson - drums

Chart performance

References 

1997 albums
Columbia Records albums
Ricochet (band) albums
Albums produced by Ron Chancey